Nazarovo power station (Nazarovskaya GRES) is a coal-fired power plant with an electrical power output of 1,210 MW near to town of Nazarovo in Krasnoyarsk Krai, Russia.  Station was commissioned for exploitation in 1961 and reached its current capacity in 2007. The ecological modernisation program started in early 2000 to ease down the influence of its work on river Chulym. The Nazarovo power station uses lignite mined as close as five km away in a coal pit with the same name.  The power station is operated by Yenisei TGK (TGK-13).

See also

 List of power stations in Russia

References 

Coal-fired power stations in Russia
Power stations built in the Soviet Union